The 2022 NFL season was the 103rd season of the National Football League (NFL). The season began on September 8, 2022, with the defending Super Bowl LVI champion Los Angeles Rams falling to Buffalo in the NFL Kickoff Game, and ended on January 8, 2023. The playoffs started on January 14 and concluded with Super Bowl LVII, the league's championship game, at State Farm Stadium in Glendale, Arizona on February 12, with Kansas City defeating Philadelphia. 

The former Washington Redskins, after two seasons of using the placeholder name Washington Football Team, were renamed the Washington Commanders prior to the start of the season.

The Week 17 game between Buffalo and Cincinnati was canceled after Buffalo safety Damar Hamlin suffered cardiac arrest on the field of play. It was the first regular season game to be canceled and not rescheduled since the 1987 NFLPA players' strike.

Player movement 
The 2022 NFL league year and trading period began on March 16. On March 14, teams were allowed to exercise options for 2022 on players with option clauses in their contracts, submit qualifying offers to their pending restricted free agents, and submit a Minimum Salary Tender to retain exclusive negotiating rights to their players with expiring 2021 contracts and fewer than three accrued seasons of free agent credit. Teams were required to be under the salary cap using the "top 51" definition (in which the 51 highest paid-players on the team's payroll must have a combined salary cap). On March 16, clubs were allowed to contact and begin contract negotiations with players whose contracts had expired and thus became unrestricted free agents.

Free agency 
Free agency began on March 16. Notable players to change teams included:

 Quarterbacks Marcus Mariota (Las Vegas to Atlanta) and Mitchell Trubisky (Buffalo to Pittsburgh)
 Running backs Chase Edmonds (Arizona to Miami), Ronald Jones II (Tampa Bay to Kansas City), Sony Michel (Los Angeles Rams to Miami), and Raheem Mostert (San Francisco to Miami)
 Wide receivers D. J. Chark (Jacksonville to Detroit), Russell Gage (Atlanta to Tampa Bay), Jakeem Grant (Chicago to Cleveland), Julio Jones (Tennessee to Tampa Bay), Zay Jones (Las Vegas to Jacksonville), Christian Kirk (Arizona to Jacksonville), Jarvis Landry (Cleveland to New Orleans), Allen Robinson (Chicago to Los Angeles Rams), JuJu Smith-Schuster (Pittsburgh to Kansas City), and Sammy Watkins (Baltimore to Green Bay)
 Tight ends Evan Engram (New York Giants to Jacksonville), Gerald Everett (Seattle to Los Angeles Chargers), Austin Hooper (Cleveland to Tennessee), O. J. Howard (Tampa Bay to Buffalo), Hayden Hurst (Atlanta to Cincinnati), and C. J. Uzomah (Cincinnati to New York Jets)
 Offensive linemen Terron Armstead (New Orleans to Miami), Duane Brown (Seattle to New York Jets), Alex Cappa (Tampa Bay to Cincinnati), La'el Collins (Dallas to Cincinnati), Austin Corbett (Los Angeles Rams to Carolina), Ted Karras (New England to Cincinnati), Andrew Norwell (Jacksonville to Washington), Rodger Saffold (Tennessee to Buffalo), Brandon Scherff (Washington to Jacksonville), and Laken Tomlinson (San Francisco to New York Jets)
 Defensive linemen Carlos Dunlap (Seattle to Kansas City), Folorunso Fatukasi (New York Jets to Jacksonville), Dante Fowler (Atlanta to Dallas), Akiem Hicks (Chicago to Tampa Bay), Sebastian Joseph-Day (Los Angeles Rams to Los Angeles Chargers), and Jarran Reed (Kansas City to Green Bay)
 Linebackers Randy Gregory (Dallas to Denver), Jordan Hicks (Arizona to Minnesota), Myles Jack (Jacksonville to Pittsburgh), Chandler Jones (Arizona to Las Vegas), Cory Littleton (Las Vegas to Carolina), Haason Reddick (Carolina to Philadelphia), Von Miller (Los Angeles Rams to Buffalo), Foyesade Oluokun (Atlanta to Jacksonville), Za'Darius Smith (Green Bay to Minnesota), and Bobby Wagner (Seattle to Los Angeles Rams)
 Defensive backs James Bradberry (New York Giants to Philadelphia), Stephon Gilmore (Carolina to Indianapolis), Casey Hayward (Las Vegas to Atlanta), J. C. Jackson (New England to Los Angeles Chargers), Tyrann Mathieu (Kansas City to New Orleans), Marcus Maye (New York Jets to New Orleans), Rodney McLeod (Philadelphia to Indianapolis), D. J. Reed (Seattle to New York Jets), Justin Reid (Houston to Kansas City), Logan Ryan (New York Giants to Tampa Bay), Charvarius Ward (Kansas City to San Francisco), Jordan Whitehead (Tampa Bay to New York Jets), Darious Williams (Los Angeles Rams to Jacksonville), Marcus Williams (New Orleans to Baltimore), and Xavier Woods (Minnesota to Carolina)
 Kicker Greg Zuerlein (Dallas to New York Jets)
 Punters Johnny Hekker (Los Angeles Rams to Carolina), Thomas Morstead (Atlanta to Miami), and Bradley Pinion (Tampa Bay to Atlanta)

Trades 
The following notable trades were made during the 2022 league year:

 March 16: Seattle traded QB Russell Wilson and a 2022 fourth round selection to Denver in exchange for QB Drew Lock, TE Noah Fant, and DE Shelby Harris along with 2022 first, second, and fifth round selections, and 2023 first and second round selections.
 March 16: Indianapolis traded QB Carson Wentz and a 2022 second round selection to Washington in exchange for a 2022 second round selection and a 2023 conditional third round selection.
 March 16: Chicago traded LB Khalil Mack to the Los Angeles Chargers in exchange for 2022 second and sixth round selections.
 March 16: Las Vegas traded DE Yannick Ngakoue to Indianapolis in exchange for CB Rock Ya-Sin.
 March 16: Dallas traded WR Amari Cooper and a 2022 sixth round selection to Cleveland in exchange for 2022 fifth and sixth round selections.
 March 16: New England traded LB Chase Winovich to Cleveland in exchange for LB Mack Wilson.
 March 17: Green Bay traded WR Davante Adams to Las Vegas in exchange for 2022 first and second round selections.
 March 18: Houston traded QB Deshaun Watson and a 2024 sixth round selection to Cleveland in exchange for 2022 first and fourth round selections, 2023 first and third round selections, and 2024 first and fourth round selections.
 March 21: Atlanta traded QB Matt Ryan to Indianapolis in exchange for a 2022 third round selection.
 March 23: Kansas City traded WR Tyreek Hill to Miami in exchange for 2022 first, second, and fourth round selections along with 2023 fourth and sixth round selections.
 April 5: Miami traded WR DeVante Parker and a 2022 fifth round selection to New England in exchange for a 2023 third round selection.
 April 28: Tennessee traded WR A. J. Brown to Philadelphia in exchange for 2022 first and third round selections.
 April 28: Baltimore traded WR Marquise Brown and a 2022 third round selection to Arizona in exchange for a 2022 first round selection.

 August 15: Philadelphia traded TE J. J. Arcega-Whiteside to Seattle in exchange for FS Ugo Amadi.
 October 9: Atlanta traded LB Deion Jones and a 2024 seventh round selection to Cleveland in exchange for a 2024 sixth round selection.
 October 20: Carolina traded RB Christian McCaffrey to San Francisco in exchange for 2023 second, third, and fourth round selections, and a 2024 fifth round selection.
 October 26: Chicago traded DE Robert Quinn to Philadelphia in exchange for a 2023 fourth round selection.
 October 27: The New York Giants traded WR Kadarius Toney to Kansas City in exchange for 2023 third and sixth round selections.
 October 31: Chicago traded LB Roquan Smith to Baltimore in exchange for LB A. J. Klein along with 2023 second and fifth round selections.
 November 1: Detroit traded TE T. J. Hockenson a 2023 4th round and a conditional 2024 4th round to Minnesota in exchange for a 2023 second-round selection and a 2024 third-round selection.
 November 1: Pittsburgh traded WR Chase Claypool to Chicago in exchange for a 2023 second-round selection.
 November 1: Denver traded LB Bradley Chubb along with a 2025 fifth-round selection to Miami for RB Chase Edmonds, a 2023 first-round selection, and 2024 fourth-round selection.
 November 1: Buffalo traded RB Zack Moss and a conditional 2023 sixth-round pick to Indianapolis for RB Nyheim Hines.

Retirements 

Notable retirements

RB Frank Gore – Five-time Pro Bowler and one-time second-team All-Pro. Played for San Francisco, Indianapolis, Miami, Buffalo, and the New York Jets during his 16-year career.
K Stephen Gostkowski – Four-time Pro Bowler, three-time All-Pro (two first-team, one second-team), and three-time Super Bowl champion (XLIX, LI, LIII). Played for New England and Tennessee during his 15-year career.
TE Rob Gronkowski – Five-time Pro Bowler, four-time first-team All-Pro, four-time Super Bowl champion (XLIX, LI, LIII, and LV), and 2014 Comeback Player of the Year. Played for New England and Tampa Bay during his 11-year career.
RB Todd Gurley – Three-time Pro Bowler, three-time All-Pro (two first-team, one second-team), 2015 Offensive Rookie of the Year, and 2017 Offensive Player of the Year. Played for the St. Louis/Los Angeles Rams and Atlanta during his six-year career.
G Richie Incognito – Four-time Pro Bowler. Played for the St. Louis Rams, Buffalo, Miami, and the Oakland/Las Vegas Raiders during his 15-year career.
SS Malcolm Jenkins – Three-time Pro Bowler, one-time second-team All-Pro, and two-time Super Bowl champion (XLIV and LII). Played for New Orleans and Philadelphia during his 13-year career.
LB Ryan Kerrigan – Four-time Pro Bowler. Played for Washington and Philadelphia during his 11-year career.
C Alex Mack – Seven-time Pro Bowler and three-time second-team All-Pro. Played for Cleveland, Atlanta, and San Francisco during his 13-year career.
LB Clay Matthews III – Six-time Pro Bowler, two-time All-Pro (one first-team, one second-team), and Super Bowl XLV champion. Played for Green Bay and the Los Angeles Rams during his 11-year career.
QB Ben Roethlisberger – Six-time Pro Bowler, two-time Super Bowl champion (XL and XLIII), and 2004 Offensive Rookie of the Year. Played for Pittsburgh during his entire 18-year career.
OT Mitchell Schwartz – Four-time All-Pro (one first-team, three second-team) and Super Bowl LIV champion. Played for Cleveland and Kansas City during his nine-year career.
FS Eric Weddle – Six-time Pro Bowler, five-time All-Pro (two first-team, three second-team), and Super Bowl LVI champion. Played for the San Diego Chargers, Baltimore, and the Los Angeles Rams during his 14-year career.
OT Andrew Whitworth – Four-time Pro Bowler, three-time All-Pro (two first-team, one second-team), 2021 Walter Payton Man of the Year, and Super Bowl LVI champion. Played for Cincinnati and the Los Angeles Rams during his 16-year career.

Other retirements

Draft 
The 2022 NFL Draft was held in Las Vegas, Nevada from April 28–30.

Rule changes 
The NFL Diversity, Equity, and Inclusion Committee announced the following policy changes on March 28:
 All teams are required to have a female or minority offensive assistant on staff for the 2022 season.
 The Rooney Rule has been expanded to include women, regardless of their racial or ethnic background.

The following rule changes were approved at the NFL Owner's Meeting on March 28:
 In the postseason only, both teams are assured of one possession in overtime, even if the first team with possession scores a touchdown. This change was made in response to several recent playoff games in which the first team to possess the ball in overtime scored a touchdown and the other team did not have a chance to respond.
 Made permanent a 2021 experimental rule change to limit the receiving team on kickoffs to no more than nine players in the "set-up zone" (the area between 10 and 25 yards from the kickoff spot).

The following changes to roster management were made on May 25:
 Players on injured reserve (IR) are eligible to return to the roster after missing four games.
 Teams can allow up to eight players to return from IR to the active roster per season. This limit was previously two players prior to 2020, but the limit was temporarily removed for 2020 and 2021. A player may return from injured reserve multiple times in a single season, but each return counts against the team's allotment of eight.
 Practice squads will remain at 16 players. The temporary increase from 12 to 16 players originally introduced in 2020 was made permanent.
 Teams may continue to elevate up to two players from the practice squad to the game-day roster for each game. A practice squad player may be elevated up to three times per season before the team is required to sign him to the active roster (up from the previous limit of two games).

The following change to the concussion protocol was made on October 8, following Tua Tagovailoa's injury in week 3:
 added the diagnosis of ataxia to the mandatory "no-go" symptoms that determine whether or not a player re-enters a game.

The following enhancements and updates to diversity, equity and inclusion efforts was announced at the NFL Fall League Meeting on October 18:
 Key decision makers in a head coach or general manager search, including owners, are required to participate in inclusive hiring training prior to the head coach or general manager search.

2022 deaths

Pro Football Hall of Fame Members 

 Len Dawson Dawson played 19 seasons in the NFL and AFL as a quarterback with the Pittsburgh Steelers, Cleveland Browns, and Dallas Texans / Kansas City Chiefs, and was inducted into the Hall of Fame in 1987. He was a one-time Pro Bowler and six-time AFL All-Star, four-time All-AFL (two first-team, two second-team), three-time AFL champion (1962, 1966, and 1969), and Super Bowl IV champion and MVP. He died on August 24, age 87.

Ray Guy Guy played 14 seasons in the NFL as a punter with the Oakland/Los Angeles Raiders, and was inducted into the Hall of Fame in 2014. He was a seven-time Pro Bowler, eight-time All-Pro (six first-team, two second-team), and three-time Super Bowl champion (XI, XV, and XVIII). He died on November 3, age 72.

Franco Harris Harris played 13 seasons in the NFL as a running back with the Pittsburgh Steelers and Seattle Seahawks, and was inducted into the Hall of Fame in 1990. He was a nine-time Pro Bowler, three-time All-Pro (one first-team, two second-team), four-time Super Bowl champion (IX, X, XIII, and XIV), and Super Bowl IX MVP. Receiver of the Immaculate Reception. Harris died on December 20, age 72.

Don Maynard Maynard played 15 seasons in the NFL and AFL as a wide receiver with the New York Giants, the New York Jets, and the St. Louis Cardinals, and was inducted into the Hall of Fame in 1987. He was a four-time Pro Bowler, four-time All-Pro (two first-team, two second-team), and Super Bowl III champion. He died on January 10, age 86.

Hugh McElhenny McElhenny played 13 seasons in the NFL as a halfback with the San Francisco 49ers, the Minnesota Vikings, the New York Giants, and the Detroit Lions, and was inducted into the Hall of Fame in 1970. He was a six-time Pro Bowler and five-time first-team All-Pro. He died on June 17, age 93.

Charley Taylor Taylor played 14 seasons in the NFL as a wide receiver/halfback with the Washington Redskins, and was inducted into the Hall of Fame in 1984. He was an eight-time Pro Bowler and six-time All-Pro (one first-team, five second-team). He died on February 19, age 80.

Charley Trippi Trippi played nine seasons in the NFL as a halfback/quarterback with the Chicago Cardinals, and was inducted into the Hall of Fame in 1968. He was a two-time Pro Bowler, two-time All-Pro (one first-team, one second-team) and 1947 NFL Champion. He died on October 19, age 100.

Rayfield Wright Wright played 13 seasons in the NFL as an offensive tackle with the Dallas Cowboys, and was inducted into the Hall of Fame in 2006. He was a six-time Pro Bowler, six-time All-Pro (three first-team, three second-team), and two-time Super Bowl champion (VI and XII). He died on April 7, age 76.

Others

Preseason 
The majority of training camps began on July 27. The preseason began on August 4 with the Pro Football Hall of Fame Game, in which Las Vegas (represented in the Hall of Fame Class of 2022 by Richard Seymour and Cliff Branch) defeated Jacksonville (represented by Tony Boselli).

In March, the league passed a resolution to require the use of "Guardian Caps," oversized outer layers of padding placed on the helmet, from the start of training camp through the second preseason game for offensive linemen, defensive linemen, linebackers, and tight ends. A guardian cap is a soft-shell padding aimed to decrease forces sustained during head-to-head contact and limit head injuries that may come with such contact.

Regular season 
The NFL released the 2022 regular season schedule on May 12, with select games announced in advance of the full schedule release.

The season is planned to be played over an 18-week schedule beginning on September 8. Each of the league's 32 teams plays 17 games, with one bye week for each team. The regular season ended on January 8, 2023; all games during the final weekend will be intra-division games, as it has been since .

Each team plays the other three teams in its own division twice, one game against each of the four teams from a division in its own conference, one game against each of the four teams from a division in the other conference, one game against each of the remaining two teams in its conference that finished in the same position in their respective divisions the previous season (e.g., the team that finished fourth in its division would play all three other teams in its conference that also finished fourth in their divisions), and one game against a team in another division in the other conference that also finished in the same position in their respective division the previous season.

The division pairings for 2022 are as follows:

Highlights of the 2022 season include:
NFL Kickoff Game: The 2022 season began with the Kickoff Game on September 8, with Buffalo defeating the defending Super Bowl LVI champion Los Angeles Rams.
NFL International Series: There were three games in London in 2022: Minnesota at New Orleans on October 2 and New York Giants at Green Bay on October 9 at Tottenham Hotspur Stadium, and Denver at Jacksonville on October 30 at Wembley Stadium. The league also staged a game in Germany for the first time: Seattle at Tampa Bay at Munich's Allianz Arena on November 13. All four games were scheduled for 9:30 a.m. ET starts. The International Series also returned to Mexico on November 21, in which San Francisco faced Arizona at Estadio Azteca in Mexico City on Monday Night Football. Minnesota, New York, Denver, Tampa Bay and San Francisco won the games.
Thanksgiving: As has been the case since , three games were played on Thursday, November 24, with Buffalo at Detroit and the New York Giants at Dallas in the traditional afternoon doubleheader, and New England at Minnesota in the nightcap. Buffalo, Dallas, and Minnesota won the games.
Christmas: Christmas Day, December 25, fell on a Sunday. When this occurs, the normal Sunday afternoon games are instead played on Saturday, Christmas Eve, while Sunday Night Football and other special national games are scheduled for Christmas Day. For 2022, the league played three games on Christmas Day for the first time, consisting of an afternoon doubleheader featuring Green Bay at Miami and Denver at the Los Angeles Rams, and the Sunday Night Football game featuring Tampa Bay at Arizona. The league also scheduled a Christmas Eve primetime game on NFL Network with Las Vegas at Pittsburgh, Green Bay, Los Angeles, Tampa Bay, and Pittsburgh won the games.

Scheduling changes 
Week 11:
 The Kansas City–Los Angeles Chargers game, originally scheduled for 4:25 p.m. ET on CBS, was flexed into NBC Sunday Night Football at 8:20 p.m. ET, replacing the originally scheduled Cincinnati–Pittsburgh game, which was moved to 4:25 p.m. ET on CBS.
 The Cleveland–Buffalo game was moved from Highmark Stadium near Buffalo to Ford Field in Detroit due to a severe winter storm affecting the Buffalo region.

Week 14:
 The Miami–Los Angeles Chargers game, originally scheduled for 4:05 p.m. ET on CBS, was flexed into NBC Sunday Night Football at 8:20 p.m. ET, replacing the originally scheduled Kansas City–Denver game, which was moved to 4:05 p.m. ET on CBS.

Week 15:
 On December 5, the NFL announced that three games would be moved to Saturday, December 17, and aired exclusively on NFL Network: Indianapolis–Minnesota at 1:00 p.m. ET, Baltimore–Cleveland at 4:30 p.m. ET, and Miami–Buffalo at 8:15 p.m. ET.
 One of the other games that the league had the option of scheduling on Saturday, New York Giants–Washington, was flexed into NBC Sunday Night Football at 8:20 p.m. ET, replacing the originally scheduled New England–Las Vegas game, which was moved to 4:05 p.m. ET on Fox.
 The remaining game that the league had the option of scheduling on Saturday, Atlanta–New Orleans, remained on Sunday afternoon, December 18.
 The Detroit–New York Jets game was cross-flexed from Fox to CBS, remaining at 1:00 p.m. ET.

Week 17:
 The Pittsburgh–Baltimore game, originally scheduled for 1:00 p.m. ET on CBS, was flexed into NBC Sunday Night Football at 8:20 p.m. ET, replacing the originally scheduled Los Angeles Rams–Los Angeles Chargers game, which was moved to 4:25 p.m. ET on CBS.
 The Buffalo–Cincinnati Monday Night Football game was suspended indefinitely with 5:58 remaining in the first quarter after Bills safety Damar Hamlin suffered cardiac arrest after tackling Bengals wide receiver Tee Higgins and was taken to the hospital for treatment. It was later announced that the game would be canceled in its entirety.

Week 18:
All Week 18 games were initially listed with a kickoff time of “TBD”  and the schedule was released on January 2 after most of Week 17 was completed.
Two games with playoff implications were moved to a Saturday doubleheader on ESPN, ABC, and ESPN+. Kansas City–Las Vegas at 4:30 pm ET and Tennessee–Jacksonville at 8:15 pm ET.
The Detroit–Green Bay game was moved to the final Sunday Night Football game at 8:20 pm ET on NBC.
All remaining games were scheduled on Sunday afternoon at either 1:00 or 4:25 pm ET on either CBS or Fox.

Regular season standings

Division

Conference

Postseason 

The 2022 playoffs began with the wild-card round, with three wild-card games played in each conference. Wild Card Weekend took place from January 14–16, 2023. The Divisional round was played from January 21-22, in which the top seed in each conference played the lowest remaining seed and the two remaining teams played each other. The winners of those games advanced to the Conference Championship games, which were played on January 29. The NFC and AFC champions will advance to Super Bowl LVII, which is scheduled for February 12 at State Farm Stadium in Glendale, Arizona.

Bracket

Records, milestones, and notable statistics 

Week 1
Matthew Stafford became the 12th player to reach 50,000 career passing yards. He also tied Drew Brees' record for the fastest player to reach this mark, doing so in 183 games.
Matt Ryan became the eighth player to reach 60,000 career passing yards.
Cade York kicked a 58-yard field goal, setting a record for longest field goal by a rookie in a season opener. The previous record of 55 yards was shared by John Hall and Blair Walsh.
Tom Brady became the oldest quarterback to start a game since quarterback starts were first recorded in 1950, at 45 years and 39 days old. The previous record of 44 years, 279 days was held by Steve DeBerg.
Week 2
Lamar Jackson set the record for most games with 100 rushing yards by a quarterback with 11. The previous record of 10 was held by Michael Vick.
Jackson also became the first player to record at least 300 passing yards, three passing touchdowns, 100 rushing yards, and one rushing touchdown in a game.
Amon-Ra St. Brown became the first player to record at least eight receptions and one receiving touchdown in six consecutive games.
Tyreek Hill tied the record for the most games with at least 10 receptions, 150 receiving yards, and two receiving touchdowns, with four. He shares the record with Jerry Rice.
Aaron Rodgers became the fifth player to reach 450 career touchdown passes.
Carson Wentz became the first player since quarterback starts were first tracked in 1950 to pass for at least 300 yards and three touchdowns in his first two starts with a new team.
Week 3
Tom Brady became the first player to reach 85,000 career passing yards.
Lamar Jackson became the first player with three passing touchdowns and 100 rushing yards in consecutive games.
Jackson also became the first player with at least 10 passing touchdowns and 200 rushing yards in the first three games of the season.
Jalen Hurts became the first player with at least 900 passing and 100 rushing yards through three games since at least 1950.
 Week 4

Patrick Mahomes became the fastest player to reach 20,000 career passing yards, doing so in 67 games. The previous record of 71 games was held by Matthew Stafford.
The Detroit Lions set the record for most combined points scored and points allowed through a team's first four games, with 281.
Week 6
Matt Ryan passed Dan Marino for seventh place on the all-time career passing yards list.
Marcus Mariota became the second player since at least 1950 with at least two passing touchdowns, one or fewer incompletions, at least 50 rushing yards, and a rushing touchdown in a game, joining Walter Payton.
Week 7
Mecole Hardman became the first wide receiver in the Super Bowl era with two or more rushing touchdowns and one or more receiving touchdowns in a single game.
Joe Burrow became the first player to record two games with 500 combined offensive yards and four touchdowns.
Burrow also set the record for most games with at least 400 passing yards in a player's first three seasons, with five. The previous record of four was held by Dan Marino.
Week 8
Tom Brady set the record for most sacks taken by a quarterback, with 556. The previous record of 554 was held by Ben Roethlisberger.
Alvin Kamara became the first player to record 10 games with at least one rushing and one receiving touchdown in his first six seasons.
Christian McCaffrey became the 11th player to record a passing, rushing, and receiving touchdown in the same game.
Derrick Henry tied the record of most games with at least 200 rushing yards, with six. He shares the record with Adrian Peterson and O. J. Simpson.
Henry also became the first player to record at least 200 rushing yards four times against a single opponent, doing so in four consecutive games against Houston.
Week 9

Jalen Hurts became the third quarterback under the age of 25 to start and win each of his team's first eight games of a season since at least 1950, joining Dan Marino and Jared Goff.
Justin Fields set the record for most rushing yards in a game by a quarterback, with 178 yards. The previous record of 173 yards was held by Michael Vick.
Fields also became the first player to rush for at least 150 yards and pass for at least three touchdowns in a game.
Tom Brady set the record for most career game-winning drives with 55. The previous record of 54 was held by Peyton Manning.

Week 10
Justin Jefferson set the record for most games with 100 receiving yards in a player’s first three seasons, with 20. The previous record of 19 was shared by Odell Beckham Jr. and Randy Moss.
Jefferson also set the record for most games with 150 yards in a player's first three seasons, with seven. The previous record of six was shared by Moss and Lance Alworth.
Jefferson also tied the record for fastest player to reach 4,000 career receiving yards, doing so in 42 games. He shares the record with Beckham and Alworth.
Patrick Mahomes set the Super Bowl era record for most touchdown passes in a player's first 75 games, with 176. The previous record of 173 was held by Dan Marino. Mahomes set this record in only 72 starts.
Justin Fields became the first player to have multiple rushing and passing touchdowns and rush for at least 100 yards in the same game.
Fields also set the super bowl era record for most rushing yards by a quarterback over a 5-game span, with 555.
Tom Brady became the first quarterback to win an NFL game in three different countries outside of the US with his win in Allianz Arena, Germany .
Week 11
Cordarrelle Patterson set the record for most career kickoffs returned for a touchdown, with nine. The previous record of eight was shared by Josh Cribbs and Leon Washington.
Derek Carr became the quarterback with the best win percentage (.800) in overtime games (minimum 10 overtime games). The previous record of .714 was held by Tom Brady.
Travis Kelce set the record for most games with at least 100 receiving yards by a tight end, with 33. The previous record of 32 was held by Rob Gronkowski.
Week 12
Justin Jefferson set the record for most receiving yards in a player’s first three seasons, with 4,248. The previous record of 4,163 yards was held by Randy Moss.
Patrick Mahomes set the record for most games with 300 passing yards in a player's first seven seasons, with 38. The previous record of 37 games was held by Dan Marino. Mahomes set this record in only 6 seasons.
Mahomes also set the record for most wins in a quarterback's first 75 starts since quarterback starts were first tracked in 1950, with 59. The previous record of 58 wins was held by Ken Stabler.
Travis Kelce set the NFL record for most receiving yards by a tight end in his first eleven seasons, with 9,918. The previous record of 9,882 yards was held by Tony Gonzalez. Kelce needed only ten seasons to set this record.
Jalen Hurts became the first player with at least 150 rushing yards, 150 passing yards, and two passing touchdowns in a single game since at least 1950.
Week 13
Tom Brady set a new NFL record for fourth-quarter comebacks by a quarterback, with 44. The previous record of 43 was held by Peyton Manning.
Justin Herbert set the record for most games with 300 passing yards in a player's first three seasons, with 20. The previous record of 19 was held by Andrew Luck.
The Green Bay Packers passed the Chicago Bears for the most all-time franchise wins, with 787.
Justin Fields became the first quarterback to rush for at least 50 yards and score a rushing touchdown in 6 straight appearances, since game logs were first tracked in 1950.
Week 14
Justin Herbert set the record for the most passing yards in a player's first three seasons, with 13,056. The previous record of 12,957 was held by Andrew Luck.
Patrick Mahomes became the fourth quarterback in the Super Bowl era to record at least 10 wins without a loss against a single opponent (Denver). He joined Luck (11–0 vs. Tennessee), Tom Brady (11–0 vs. Atlanta), and John Elway (11–0 vs. New England).
Jalen Hurts became the second quarterback to record at least 10 rushing touchdowns in multiple seasons, joining Cam Newton.  Hurts also became the first quarterback to reach the mark in consecutive seasons.
Ja'Marr Chase became the second player with at least 2,000 receiving yards and 20 receiving touchdowns prior to his 23rd birthday, joining Randy Moss.
Travis Kelce became the fifth tight end to reach 10,000 receiving yards.  He also became the fastest tight end to reach this mark, doing so in his 140 games. The previous record of 177 games was held by Tony Gonzalez.
Derek Carr became the third player with at least 3,000 passing yards in each of his first nine seasons, joining Peyton Manning and Russell Wilson.
Tyreek Hill became the first player to score a touchdown in each of the following five categories: receiving, rushing, kickoff return, punt return, and fumble recovery. Hill also became the first player to score a touchdown of 50 or more yards in five different ways.
Week 15
The Minnesota Vikings set the record for the biggest comeback win when they came back from 33 points down against the Indianapolis Colts to win 39–36 in overtime.
Kirk Cousins set the record for most passing yards in the second half of a game, with 417.
Justin Fields became the third quarterback to record at least 1,000 rushing yards in a season, joining Lamar Jackson and Michael Vick.
Justin Herbert became the first player to reach at least 4,000 passing yards in each of his first three seasons.
Derek Carr became the fourth player to record at least 35,000 passing yards in his first nine seasons, joining Matt Ryan, Peyton Manning, and Dan Marino.
Week 16
Josh Allen set the record for the most touchdowns in a player’s first five seasons, with 174. The previous record of 171 touchdowns was held by Dan Marino.
Justin Jefferson set the record for the most games with at least 100 receiving yards in a player's first four seasons, with 24. The previous record of 23 games was held by Randy Moss.
Aaron Rodgers passed Dan Marino for eighth place on all-time completions list.
Kirk Cousins tied the records for most game winning drives and most fourth quarter comebacks in a season, both with eight. He shares both records with Matthew Stafford.
Tom Brady became the first quarterback to record 250 career wins.
Austin Ekeler became the second player to have at least ten rushing touchdowns and five receiving touchdowns in consecutive seasons, joining Marshall Faulk.
Travis Kelce became the fifth tight end to reach 800 career receptions. Kelce also became the fastest tight end to reach the milestone, doing so in 142 games.
Marcus Jones is the only player in the last 75 years to have a receiving, punt return and interception return touchdown in one season.
Week 17
Tom Brady became the first player to attempt 12,000 career passes.
Brady also became the first player to complete at least 30 passes in five consecutive games and the first player with at least 30 completions in 10 games in one season.
Christian McCaffrey set the record for most receptions by a running back in his first six seasons, with 439. The previous record of 434 record was held by Roger Craig.
Austin Ekeler became the third running back with at least 100 receptions and 15 touchdowns in a season, joining McCaffrey and LaDainian Tomlinson. He also became the fifth running back with at least 100 catches in a season.
Jerick McKinnon set the record for most consecutive games with a receiving touchdown by a running back, with five.
Patrick Mahomes became the third player with multiple 5,000-yard passing seasons, joining Drew Brees and Brady.
Mahomes also tied the record for most wins against a single opponent with 0 losses, with 11 wins against Denver. He shares the record with Andrew Luck (11–0 against Tennessee).
Week 18
Patrick Mahomes set the record for most total offensive yards in a season, with 5,608. The previous record of 5,562 was held by Drew Brees.
Justin Jefferson set the record for most catches in a player's first three seasons, with 324. The previous record of 321 was held by Michael Thomas.
The Minnesota Vikings set the record for most wins for a team with a negative point differential, as they won 13 games with a point differential of –3.
Tom Brady set the record for most pass completions in a season, with 490, breaking his own record of 485.
Brady also set the record for most attempts in a season, with 733. The previous record of 727 was set by Matthew Stafford.
Aaron Rodgers became the eighth player to complete 5,000 passes.
Nyheim Hines tied the record for most kickoff returns for a touchdown in a game, with two. He shares the record with ten other players.
Josh Allen became the first player with three consecutive seasons of at least 35 passing touchdowns and at least five rushing touchdowns.
Brock Purdy set the record for most wins to start his career with multiple touchdown passes in each game, with five. The previous record of four was held by Kurt Warner.
Ryan Stonehouse set the record for punting yardage in a season, with 53.1 yards per punt. The previous record of 51.4 was held by Sammy Baugh.
Stonehouse also set the rookie record for net punting yardage in a season, with 44.0 net yards per punt, beating the previous record of 42.6.
 Daniel Carlson set the record for the most field goals of 50 or more yards in a season, with 11. The previous record of 10 was shared by Blair Walsh, Justin Tucker, and Brandon McManus.
 Justin Herbert set the record for most total touchdowns by a player in his first three seasons with 102.  The previous record of 100 was held by Dan Marino.
 Herbert also became the second player to pass for at least 25 touchdowns in each of his first three seasons, joining Peyton Manning.
Wild Card Round
 Brock Purdy became the youngest player to throw for 300 yards and three touchdowns in a playoff game, at 23 years and 18 days of age. The previous record was held by Dan Marino.
 Purdy also became the first rookie to record four combined passing and rushing touchdowns in a playoff game.
 Sam Hubbard set a record for the longest fumble return in a playoff game, with a 98-yard return. 
 Brett Maher set the record for most missed extra point attempts in a game, with four. The previous record of three was shared by nine players.
 The Minnesota Vikings became the first team to lose a game despite completing over 80% of passes, having no turnovers, and not allowing a sack.
Divisional Round
Travis Kelce set the record for most receptions by a tight end in a playoff game with 14.  The previous record of 13 was shared by Kelce, Shannon Sharpe, and Kellen Winslow.
Conference Championship Games
The Kansas City Chiefs became the first team to host a conference championship game in five consecutive seasons.
Super Bowl LVII
Jason Kelce and Travis Kelce became the first set of brothers to play against each other in a Super Bowl.
Jalen Hurts tied the record for most rushing touchdowns in a Super Bowl, with three. He shares the record with Terrell Davis. Hurts also became the first quarterback to reach this mark, breaking the record of two touchdowns previously held by Jim McMahon.
Hurts also set the record for most rushing yards by a quarterback in the Super Bowl, with 66.  The previous record of 64 was held by Steve McNair.
Kadarius Toney set the record for the longest punt return in a Super Bowl, with a 65-yard return.  The previous record of 61 yards was held by Jordan Norwood.

Regular-season statistical leaders

Awards

Individual season awards

The 12th Annual NFL Honors, saluting the best players and plays from the 2022 season, was held on February 9, 2023, at the Phoenix Symphony Hall in Phoenix, Arizona.

All-Pro team 

The following players were named First Team All-Pro by the Associated Press:

Players of the week/month 
The following were named the top performers during the 2022 season:

Notable events

Brian Flores' discrimination lawsuit 

On February 1, former Miami Dolphins head coach Brian Flores sued the NFL, the Dolphins, the New York Giants, and the Denver Broncos, alleging racism, violations of federal employment law, and that his interviews were a sham meant solely to fulfill the Rooney Rule. The lawsuit also alleges that during Flores' tenure with the Dolphins, team owner Stephen M. Ross pressured him to deliberately lose games, offering him $100,000 for each game he lost in order for the Dolphins to get better draft picks for the following season and that Ross fired Flores after he refused to comply with this pressure. The lawsuit seeks damages and injunctive relief in the form of changes to hiring, retention, termination, and pay transparency practices for coaching and executive positions in the NFL.

On April 6, former Arizona Cardinals head coach Steve Wilks and former assistant coach Ray Horton joined the lawsuit with similar allegations against the league, the Arizona Cardinals, Houston Texans, and Tennessee Titans.

Deshaun Watson sexual assault allegations 
In March and April 2021, then-Houston Texans quarterback Deshaun Watson was accused by 22 massage therapists of sexual misconduct.

On March 11, 2022, a grand jury declined to indict Watson on criminal charges related to "harassment and sexual misconduct." On that date he still faced 22 civil lawsuits, many alleging sexual misconduct and assault. After being cleared of criminal charges, Watson was traded to the Cleveland Browns and agreed to a new, fully guaranteed, five-year, $230 million contract with the Browns, the most guaranteed money in NFL history.

After two more accusers joined the lawsuit in June 2022, Watson settled 23 of the 24 lawsuits in July and August.

On August 1, as a result of these allegations, Watson was suspended for six regular season games to start the 2022 season by judge Sue Lewis Robinson. Two days later, the NFL appealed the suspension, seeking to extend the suspension to at least a full season as well as seeking a fine and establishing a requirement for Watson to seek treatment for his conduct. The appeal was reviewed by former New Jersey Attorney General Peter C. Harvey.

On August 18, after the NFL and the NFLPA reached a settlement, Watson was suspended for the first 11 games of the season and was fined $5 million.

Miami Dolphins tampering 
On August 2, it was announced that following a six-month independent investigation by Mary Jo White and a team of lawyers, the Miami Dolphins would forfeit their 2023 first-round draft pick and a 2024 third-round pick for violating the league's anti-tampering policy on three occasions from 2019 to 2022 by engaging in impermissible conversations with quarterback Tom Brady and coach Sean Payton, both of whom were under contract with other teams. Dolphins owner Stephen M. Ross was also fined $1.5 million and suspended through October 17, and was prohibited from being at the Dolphins' facility or representing the team at any event until then. He was also prohibited from attending any league meeting before the annual meeting in 2023 and was removed from all league committees indefinitely. Vice chairman/limited partner Bruce Beal was fined $500,000 and will not be permitted to attend any league meetings for the rest of the 2022 season.

Denver Broncos sale 
On August 9, the league owners unanimously approved the sale of the Denver Broncos from the Pat Bowlen Trust to the Walton-Penner Family Ownership Group, led by Greg Penner, for a price of $4.65 billion. The new owners were formally introduced the next day.

Washington Commanders potential sale 
On November 2, it was announced that Commanders' owner Dan Snyder and his wife had engaged Bank of America Securities to facilitate the potential sale of the team. Any potential transaction would have to be presented to the NFL Finance Committee for review and require an affirmative vote by 75% of the owners (24 of 32). The team is currently valued at $5.6 billion, according to Forbes.

Damar Hamlin cardiac arrest 

During the Week 17 Monday Night Football game on January 2 between Buffalo and Cincinnati, Buffalo safety Damar Hamlin collapsed and remained motionless after making a tackle on Cincinnati wide receiver Tee Higgins. Medical staff rushed to his side near midfield to perform CPR, and used a defibrillator on Hamlin before taking him by ambulance to the University of Cincinnati Medical Center. It was later revealed that he had suffered cardiac arrest and was in critical condition. The game was halted, and the two teams returned to their locker rooms. At the time, there was 5:58 remaining in the first quarter, with Cincinnati leading 7–3.

It was reported by both ESPN and Westwood One that play would resume and teams would be given a warm-up period for five minutes. However, the game remained suspended, and the NFL later denied the reports it planned to compel the teams to finish the game that evening. Shortly after 10 p.m., an hour after Hamlin's injury, the game was postponed until further notice by the NFL.

The following day, the NFL released a statement saying the game would not be resumed that week, but that it had not made a decision on when or whether it would be rescheduled. On January 5, the NFL announced that the game would be canceled entirely, saying, it was "difficult, but necessary" under the "extraordinary circumstances. It was the first time since the 1987 players' strike that a regular season game was canceled." Addressing the implications for team standings and playoffs, it said "not playing the Buffalo-Cincinnati game to its conclusion will have no effect on which clubs qualify for the postseason. No club would qualify for the postseason and no club will be eliminated based on the outcome of this game." As a result, both teams finished the season with only 16 regular season games, making it the first time since  in which some teams played more regular season games than the others.

Head coaching and front office changes

Head coaches

Off-season

In-season

Front office personnel

Off-season

In-season

Stadiums 
 This is the final year on Buffalo's lease on Highmark Stadium. On March 28, the State of New York announced an agreement with the team to construct a new state owned and funded stadium adjacent to Highmark Stadium, which will be demolished after the new stadium is completed. Buffalo will remain at Highmark Stadium during the new stadium's construction, then will move to the new stadium once it is complete and play there through at least 2052, leasing the stadium from the state.
 On July 11, Pittsburgh announced that it sold the naming rights to its home stadium to the insurance broker Acrisure after its deal with Heinz expired, resulting in the stadium being renamed from Heinz Field to Acrisure Stadium.
 On August 9, Cincinnati announced that it sold the naming rights to its home stadium to human resources software company Paycor, resulting in the stadium being renamed from Paul Brown Stadium to Paycor Stadium.

Uniforms

Uniform changes 
 Dallas announced the return of their throwbacks inspired by the team's uniforms worn from 1960–1963 on July 21. They will wear this design on Thanksgiving Day and for the first time since the 2012 season.
 Green Bay announced the return of the all-white uniforms used in the NFL's former Color Rush program for one game. The uniform features Green Bay's typical white jerseys with white pants. They will use this combination for the first time since 2019.
 The Los Angeles Rams swapped the designation of their white uniforms. The throwback-inspired white uniforms introduced as an alternate in 2021 will serve as the team's primary. The "bone" uniform will serve as the third design and will be worn during two games.
 New England announced the return of their red "Pat Patriot" throwback uniforms as an alternate uniform on June 22. They will don this design for the first time since the 2012 season. The Patriots reintroduced their silver pants on October 24, wearing them for the first time since the team's 2020 uniform redesign.
 New Orleans announced the return of their late-1960s home throwbacks on November 16. These will be worn for one game. The team last wore this uniform in 2016.
 The New York Giants announced they would bring back their uniforms worn between 1980–1999 for two games on July 20.
 Philadelphia introduced a new wordmark, replacing the previous design installed in 1996.
 Pittsburgh wore a throwback uniform for one game modeled after their design worn during the 1972 season. These uniforms commemorated the 50th anniversary of the Immaculate Reception and were worn for the first time since 2019.
 San Francisco modified their uniforms to feature their classic wordmark, matching their home end zone design. The uniforms include three shoulder stripes, replacing the two stripe design.
 Washington revealed new branding as the Washington Commanders on February 2. They retained their burgundy and gold colors while introducing a new "W" logo and new uniforms. The new burgundy uniforms have gold numerals trimmed in white, while the new white uniforms feature burgundy and white gradient numerals with black trim. The team also introduced black third jerseys with gold numerals trimmed in burgundy.

Alternate helmets 
In June 2021, the NFL approved a rule that would allow teams to wear alternate helmets for the 2022 season, repealing a one-helmet rule put in place in 2013. Alternate helmets are required to be accompanied with alternate uniforms.
 Arizona introduced a black helmet with a red undertone on July 24. The helmet was worn for one preseason game and will be worn for two regular season games.
 Atlanta reintroduced a red helmet to pair with their throwback uniform on June 1 after previously using the helmet with this set from 2009–2012. These will be worn for two games.
 Carolina introduced a new black helmet on July 19. This helmet will be worn with the team's all-black uniform for one game. Carolina's black uniform remains their primary colored design despite the rule which requires that alternate helmets be paired with alternate uniforms.
 Chicago introduced an orange helmet on July 24. It will be paired with Chicago's alternate orange uniforms for two games.
 Cincinnati introduced a white alternate helmet on July 14. The design retains the helmet's black stripes and will be accompanied with their all-white uniforms used in the former "Color Rush" program.
 Dallas announced their alternate throwback uniform listed above will include the white helmet worn by the team from 1960–1963. Additionally, Dallas will wear an alternative set of decals with the white shell to pair with the "Color Rush" uniform introduced in 2015.
 Houston introduced a "Battle Red" helmet to pair with their like-colored alternate uniform on July 12. It is the first time that the team will utilize a different colored helmet in franchise history (the team has used "Deep Steel Blue" helmets since their inception in 2002). The helmet will be worn for one game.
 New England announced their alternate throwback uniform listed above will include the white helmet with the former "Pat Patriot" logo.
 New Orleans introduced a new black helmet to pair with their white alternate uniform on June 16.
 The New York Giants announced as part of the above throwback uniform, they will bring back the navy blue helmets with the "GIANTS" wordmark worn in the 1980s and 1990s.
 The New York Jets introduced a new black helmet to pair with their black alternate uniforms on July 22.
 Philadelphia introduced a new black helmet to pair with their black alternate uniform on March 29.
 Washington introduced a new alternate set with black helmets in their rebrand on February 2, becoming the first team in the league to unveil secondary helmets. The helmets feature the gold "W" logo on the front of the shell, the player's jersey number on each side, and the flag of Washington, D.C. in burgundy and gold on the back.

Patches 
 Buffalo wore a patch with the number 3 on it in Week 18 in support of Damar Hamlin after his in-game collapse the previous week.
 Miami announced a patch to celebrate the 50th anniversary of the team's 1972 undefeated season on August 3. The patch will be featured on their throwback uniform for one game.
 Pittsburgh will accompany their 1972-inspired throwback uniforms with a patch to commemorate the Immaculate Reception's 50th anniversary. The patch features a silhouetted Franco Harris.
 Washington unveiled a logo commemorating the 90th anniversary of the franchise.

Diversity initiative 
During Weeks 4 and 5, players, executives, and coaches wore patches and decals of international flags to represent their national heritage. Over 50 countries and territories were represented, with over 200 individuals participating.

Media

Television 
This was the ninth and final season under the current broadcast contracts with CBS, Fox, and NBC, before new 11-year contracts for all three networks begin in 2023. This included "cross-flexing" (switching) Sunday afternoon games between CBS and Fox before or during the season, regardless of the conference of the visiting team. Super Bowl LVII was televised by Fox.

Following the expiration of their eight-year contract, ESPN and ABC agreed to a one-year bridge contract for the 2022 season, before their new 11-year contract takes effect in 2023 to coincide with those of the other three broadcasters. As with the previous season, ESPN held the rights to a Saturday doubleheader during the final week of the season, simulcast with ABC, along with more simulcasts of select Monday Night Football games on ABC. Also this year, ABC aired its first exclusive game since  on September 19, as part of a split-network doubleheader with ESPN.

Under separate deals, this was the second postseason in NBC and ABC/ESPN's seven- and five-year deals to air the Sunday and Monday night Wild Card games, respectively. Fox replaced CBS in televising two Wild Card games during this postseason. It was later confirmed that CBS, NBC and Fox will start to annually rotate the extra Wild Card games, while ABC/ESPN will continue to air only one Wild Card game per season.

NFL Network continued to televise select regular season games, including three International Series games.

Fox Deportes aired Spanish-language coverage of Fox games. ESPN Deportes did the same for ESPN/ABC games, CBS games was available on SAP and  Universo/ Telemundo Deportes (select games) did the same for NBC games.

ESPN2's Monday Night Football with Peyton and Eli was renewed for an additional season, taking it through the 2024 NFL season. CBS will continue to produce alternative, youth-oriented telecasts of selected games on sister channel Nickelodeon; Nickelodeon simulcasted CBS's Christmas Day game, marking its first regular-season broadcast.

DirecTV signed a multi-year deal with Amazon Prime Video to allow Thursday Night Football to be shown on DirecTV's packages for business customers. This agreement is primarily to allow entertainment venues such as bars and casinos  to continue offering the games without reconfiguring their systems to accommodate a streaming-only platform.

This was the final season under DirecTV's deal for exclusive rights to the NFL Sunday Ticket out-of-market sports package. DirecTV has held exclusive rights since the package's launch in 1994. DirecTV executives have questioned the current value of NFL Sunday Ticket after losing money over the past few years. In September 2021, NFL Commissioner Roger Goodell suggested that NFL Sunday Ticket could be more attractive on a digital platform. On December 22, 2022, it was announced that Google had acquired the rights to Sunday Ticket and that it would be streamed on YouTube TV and YouTube Primetime Channels starting in 2023.

Streaming 

This was the first year in which Thursday Night Football exclusively streamed on Amazon Prime Video and Twitch. Fox and NFL Network opted out of their final season of the 2018–2022 TNF deal, allowing Amazon to take over one season before its 2023–2033 TNF agreement was to go into effect.

This was also the first year in which ESPN+ exclusively streams one International Series game per year along with simulcasts of all ABC games.

Paramount+ continues to simulcast all CBS games and Peacock simulcasts all NBC games.

The NFL's mobile streaming contract with Verizon expired following the 2021 season (which included mobile streaming of live local and nationally televised games along with cellular streaming of NFL Network); it was reported that the league was preparing to move these rights behind a paywall of an in-house subscription service. In July, the NFL announced that NFL Game Pass would be replaced in the United States by NFL+, which will stream in-market games and the NFL Network on mobile devices only, radio broadcasts for all games, and most out-of-market preseason games. The on-demand full, condensed, and "All 22" bird's-eye view game replays offered by NFL Game Pass will now be under a premium tier of NFL+.

Radio 
In March, the NFL renewed its national radio contract with Westwood One, maintaining its package of radio rights to all primetime, marquee, and playoff games, while adding audio coverage of other events such as the NFL Draft and NFL Honors. It also greatly expands the ability for its broadcasts to be distributed for free via digital platforms, including via local affiliates' "primary digital platforms", and via the NFL app. Compass Media, ESPN Radio and Sports USA will continue to broadcast select Sunday afternoon games nationally on radio.

Personnel changes 
On March 16, ESPN signed Joe Buck and Troy Aikman — who were Fox's lead commentary team for 20 seasons — to a multi-year deal to become the new lead commentators of Monday Night Football. ESPN's previous MNF broadcasters Steve Levy and Louis Riddick continue as ESPN's secondary NFL broadcast team, with Dan Orlovsky replacing Brian Griese who left ESPN for a coaching job with San Francisco.

On March 23, Amazon announced that longtime NBC play-by-play announcer Al Michaels and ESPN college football analyst Kirk Herbstreit would serve as its lead broadcast team for Thursday Night Football. Amazon later added ABC News reporter Kaylee Hartung as its sideline reporter. Mike Tirico—who had been NBC's secondary play-by-play announcer and Michaels' designated fill-in since joining the network in 2016—will succeed Michaels as the lead commentator for Sunday Night Football, with Maria Taylor succeeding him as lead studio host and Jason Garrett replacing Drew Brees on the Football Night in America panel. Melissa Stark is also replacing Michele Tafoya (who departed after Super Bowl LVI to pursue a political career) as sideline reporter. Amazon's studio panel will be led by Fox’s Charissa Thompson, with analysts Tony Gonzalez, Ryan Fitzpatrick, Richard Sherman, and Andrew Whitworth. Bleacher Report and Turner Sports’ Taylor Rooks and NBC’s Michael Smith also make contributions.

With Buck and Aikman's departure, Fox's number-2 commentary team of Kevin Burkhardt and Greg Olsen were promoted to the network's top pairing. Replacing Burkhardt and Olsen are Joe Davis, who is also Buck’s replacement for Fox’s MLB coverage, and Daryl Johnston, starting his third stint as Fox’s number 2 analyst. Kristina Pink, who was one of Fox’s two TNF reporters from 2018 to 2021, returns to Sunday reporting duties to join the team of Adam Amin and Mark Schlereth. Robert Smith also transfers from Fox’s college football coverage to join Chris Myers.

Most watched regular season games 
DH = doubleheader; Single = singleheader SNF = Sunday Night Football; MNF = Monday Night Football; TNF = Thursday Night Football

*Note – All single and DH matchups listed in table are the matchups that were viewed to the largest percentage of the market.

In addition, the January 2 Buffalo–Cincinnati game averaged 23.8 million viewers across ABC, ESPN, and ESPN2 from approximately 8:30 pm to 10:09 pm, making it the most-watched Monday Night Football broadcast since the series was moved to ESPN in 2006.

References 

NFL
National Football League seasons